The Bloodvein River is a river in Canada. It flows west from its headwaters in Red Lake in northwest Ontario to the east side of Lake Winnipeg in Manitoba through the boreal forests of the Canadian Shield. Lakes along its length include Knox Lake, Pipestone Lake and Artery Lake.

First Nation peoples have used the river for centuries, and their petroglyphs and rock paintings can be found on some shoreline cliffs.  The river along with many other rivers on the east side of Lake Winnipeg is part of a unique wilderness area untouched by major developments such as logging roads, mines, or dams.

The Bloodvein River became Manitoba's first Canadian Heritage River in 1987. For most of its length, the river is within Atikaki Provincial Park in Manitoba and the Woodland Caribou Provincial Park in Ontario.
It became part of a United Nations World Heritage Site in 2018.

The First Nation community of Bloodvein situated at the mouth is the only major community along the river. The community is served by the Bloodvein River Airport.

From 1980 to 2015, Bloodvein was only accessible by the HMV Edgar Wood Ferry during warm months. The ferry operated for 35 years until it was cancelled in 2015, due to decreased usage after the completion of a road allowing access to Bloodvein.

Fish species
Northern pike, walleye, channel catfish, whitefish, lake trout, sturgeon (catch and release only), chestnut lamprey

See also
List of rivers of Manitoba
List of rivers of Ontario

References

Rivers of Manitoba
Rivers of Kenora District
Canadian Heritage Rivers